Jacob Bigeleisen (pronounced BEEG-a-lie-zen; May 2, 1919 – August 7, 2010) was an American chemist who worked on the Manhattan Project on techniques to extract uranium-235 from uranium ore, an isotope that can sustain nuclear fission and would be used in developing an atomic bomb but that is less than 1% of naturally occurring uranium. While the method of using photochemistry that Bigeleisen used as an approach was not successful in isolating useful quantities of uranium-235 for the war effort, it did lead to the development of isotope chemistry, which takes advantage of the ways that different isotopes of an element interact to form chemical bonds.

Biography
Bigeleisen was born on May 2, 1919, in Paterson, New Jersey. He graduated in 1935 from Eastside High School, where he was one of less than 200 of 1,200 students who took a rigorous classical curriculum. His mother wanted him to go to college and a friend suggested that he study chemistry, noting that Paterson's dye companies that served the textile plants there would always need chemists. He attended the University College of New York University in the Bronx, earned a master's degree in 1941 from Washington State College in Pullman, and was awarded a doctorate in 1943 from the University of California, Berkeley.

Manhattan Project
He became part of the Manhattan Project at Columbia University, where he worked on methods to achieve the separation of the uranium-235 from the more plentiful isotope uranium-238 needed to complete an atomic bomb using the enriched uranium. The method of photochemistry that Bigeleisen researched did not lead to an effective method of separating the uranium isotopes, and gaseous diffusion and methods that took advantage of the electromagnetic properties of uranium proved to be more effective means of isotope separation. Bigeleisen's research led to the development of isotope chemistry based on the principle that heavier isotopes formed stronger chemical bonds allowing for the creation of a straightforward theory to explain the progress of chemical reactions through the interaction of isotopes in gaseous form, which he did together with Maria Goeppert-Mayer, who would later win the Nobel Prize in Physics. Chemists can gain a better understanding of a chemical reaction by using different isotopes to analyze the differing reaction rates, which has allowed for advances in chemical physics, geochemistry and molecular biology. Bigeleisen developed the basic theories of the effect of isotopic substitution on chemical equilibrium (equilibrium isotope effect) and on reaction rates (kinetic isotope effect).

Research he did in collaboration with Harold Urey that studied the varying levels of isotopes of oxygen in marine fossils allowed for the determination of the water temperature that prevailed while the animals were alive.

He did research at Ohio State University and the University of Chicago after the war. He was hired in 1948 by the Brookhaven National Laboratory, before moving to the University of Rochester in 1968 and to the State University at Stony Brook in 1978. He was elected  a member of the National Academy of Sciences in 1966, and a Fellow of the American Academy of Arts and Sciences in 1968.  In 1974, he was awarded a Guggenheim Fellowship.

In an address in March 1983 at Washington State University at ceremonies where he was awarded the college's Distinguished Alumnus Award, Bigeleisen advocated on behalf of nuclear disarmament, saying that "we have to stop putting our efforts into building more and more bombs" and that the time had come to start dismantling the tens of thousands of nuclear warheads in the nation's stockpile. While saying that he didn't regret his participation in the Manhattan Project, he said that "having lived through that time, that any further use of nuclear weapons is out of the question."

Death
Bigeleisen died at age 91 on August 7, 2010, in Arlington, Virginia due to pulmonary disease. He was survived by his wife, Grace, as well as by three sons and six grandchildren.

References

1919 births
2010 deaths
American chemists
Brookhaven National Laboratory staff
Eastside High School (Paterson, New Jersey) alumni
Fellows of the American Physical Society
Fellows of the American Academy of Arts and Sciences
Manhattan Project people
Members of the United States National Academy of Sciences
New York University alumni
Ohio State University faculty
People from Paterson, New Jersey
Stony Brook University faculty
University of California, Berkeley alumni
University of Chicago faculty
University of Rochester faculty
Washington State University alumni
Deaths from lung disease